The 1992 Volvo International was a men's tennis tournament played on outdoor hard courts at the Cullman-Heyman Tennis Center in New Haven, Connecticut in the United States and was part of the Championship Series of the 1992 ATP Tour. It was the 20th edition of the tournament and ran from August 17 through August 24, 1992. Stefan Edberg won the singles title.

Finals

Singles

 Stefan Edberg defeated  MaliVai Washington 7–6(7–4), 6–1
 It was Edberg's 2nd title of the year and the 51st of his career.

Doubles

 Kelly Jones /  Rick Leach defeated  Patrick McEnroe /  Jared Palmer 7–6, 6–7, 6–2
 It was Jones' 2nd title of the year and the 9th of his career. It was Leach's 2nd title of the year and the 22nd of his career.

External links
 ITF – tournament details

 
Volvo International
Volvo International
Volvo International
Volvo International